Gustaf Allan Pettersson (19 September 1911 – 20 June 1980) was a Swedish composer and violist. He is considered one of the 20th century's most important Swedish composers, he was described as one of the last great symphonists, often compared to Gustav Mahler. His music can hardly be confused with other 20th-century works. In the final decade of his life, his symphonies (typically one-movement works) developed an international following, particularly in Germany and Sweden. Of these, his best known work is Symphony No. 7. His music later found success in the United States. The conductors Antal Doráti and Sergiu Comissiona premiered and recorded several of his symphonies. Pettersson's song cycle Barefoot Songs influenced many of his compositions. Doráti arranged eight of the Barefoot Songs. Birgit Cullberg produced three ballets based on Pettersson's music.

Pettersson studied at the Royal Swedish Academy of Music's conservatory. For more than a decade, he was a violist in the Stockholm Concert Society; after retiring he devoted himself exclusively to composition. Later in his life, he experienced rheumatoid arthritis. Pettersson was awarded the Litteris et Artibus, a Swedish royal medal established in 1853.

Biography

Early life
Born on 19 September 1911, Gustaf Allan Pettersson was the youngest of four children. His father, Karl Viktor Pettersson (1875–1952), was a violent, alcoholic blacksmith, and his mother, Ida Paulina (née Svenson) (1876–1960), was a dressmaker. Pettersson was born at Granhammar manor in Västra Ryd parish in the Uppland province of Sweden. He grew up poor in Stockholm's Södermalm district, where he lived during his whole life. He once said: 
With his parents and siblings, Pettersson lived in a damp, one-room basement apartment with bars on the window. When he was 10, Pettersson bought a cheap violin with money he earned from selling Christmas cards and taught himself to play it. Even the beatings he received from his father and the threat of reform school could not diminish his interest in music. Through strict self-discipline and with the help of music, Pettersson freed himself from his social misery and difficult family circumstances. Aged 14, he finished elementary school and took up full-time practice on the violin. He later made two unsuccessful attempts to enter the Royal Swedish Academy of Music's conservatory.

In 1930, he began studying violin and later the viola, as well as counterpoint and harmony, at the Royal Swedish Academy of Music's conservatory (Royal College of Music, Stockholm). At the beginning of World War II, he was in Paris, studying the viola with the French violist Maurice Vieux. Pettersson won the Jenny Lind scholarship prize in 1938, using it to study abroad.

Later life
During the 1940s he worked as a violist in the Stockholm Concert Society (later the Royal Stockholm Philharmonic Orchestra). He also studied composition with the composer and conductor Karl-Birger Blomdahl, orchestration with the conductor Tor Mann, and counterpoint with organist and composer Otto Olsson. In 1943, he married a physiotherapist, Gudrun Tyra Charlotta Gustafsson (1921–2017).

In September 1951, he went to Paris to study composition and was a student of composers René Leibowitz, Arthur Honegger, Olivier Messiaen, and Darius Milhaud. Pettersson returned to Sweden at the end of 1952. In the early 1950s, he was diagnosed with rheumatoid arthritis. He gave up playing the viola and began devoting his life to composition. In 1954, Pettersson received an annual state composition grant for his first time.

By the time of his Symphony No. 5, completed in 1962, his mobility and health were compromised considerably. In 1964, the government granted him a lifelong guaranteed income. His greatest success came a few years later with his  (1966), which premiered on 13 October 1968 in Stockholm Concert Hall with Antal Doráti conducting the Stockholm Philharmonic Orchestra. A recording of his seventh symphony, with the same conductor and orchestra, was released in 1969. It was a breakthrough, establishing his international reputation, and he received two Swedish Grammis in 1970. The conductors Antal Doráti and Sergiu Comissiona premiered and made first recordings of several of Pettersson's symphonies and contributed to his rise to fame during the 1970s.

Pettersson was hospitalized for nine months in 1970, soon after the composition of his Symphony No. 9, his longest symphony. He began writing the condensed Symphony No. 10 (1972) from his sickbed. Pettersson was admitted to Karolinska Hospital, because of a life-threatening kidney ailment. He recovered, but rheumatoid arthritis confined him most of the time to his fourth-floor apartment in a building with no elevator. In 1975, after a dispute about a change in a concert program for an American tour, the Stockholm Philharmonic was forbidden to perform works by Pettersson "for all time". The ban was lifted in 1976. Pettersson was awarded the Litteris et Artibus, a Swedish royal medal established in 1853, in 1977. In autumn 1978, he moved to a state living quarters. He began writing his seventeenth symphony, but died, age 68, in Stockholm's Maria Magdalena parish before finishing it. He is buried in the Högalid Church columbarium.

Music
Pettersson's music can be compared to Mahler's symphonic output, especially in the magnificent design and the passion and dynamism. The symphonic eccentric Pettersson is not an avant-gardist. His kinetic and organic development of musical matter uses traditional means of expression. Basic motifs are constantly being changed and developed. Pettersson's writing is very strenuous and often has many simultaneous polyphonic lines. His symphonies end on common major or minor chords—but tonality, which depends on some sense, however attenuated, of tonal progression, is found mostly in slower sections. This can be shown at the openings and endings of his 6th and 7th symphonies, and the end of his 9th. Overwhelmingly serious in tone, often dissonant, his music rises to ferocious climaxes, relieved, especially in his later works, by lyrical oases ("").

Pettersson's music has a very distinctive sound and can hardly be confused with that of any other 20th-century composer. His symphonies, which range from 22 to 70 minutes long, are typically one-movement works.  Pettersson's music is demanding on performers and listeners.

Pettersson quoted songs from his own 24 Barefoot Songs in several of his compositions.

Ivanka Stoïanova designed a theory of musical space about Pettersson's music.

Most of his music has now been recorded at least once and much of it is now available in published scores.

Works
Pettersson began composing songs and smaller chamber works in the 1930s.

His production from the 1940s includes the song cycle twenty-four Barefoot Songs (1943–1945) based on his poems and a dissonant concerto for violin and string quartet (1949), which is influenced by Béla Bartók and Paul Hindemith. Pettersson soon found his compositional style.
In 1951, he created the experimental Seven Sonatas for two Violins. At the same time, he composed the first of his seventeen symphonies, which he left unfinished. This work has been recorded in a performing version prepared by trombonist and conductor Christian Lindberg in 2011.
Pettersson about the symphonic output of the 1950s: 
It took four years to write the conceptual and style-defining Symphony No. 6 (1963–1966). His Symphony No. 7 and Symphony No. 8 (1968–1969) have been recorded more than his other works and are probably his best-known. In the 1970s, he composed two related works about social protest and compassion, the Symphony No. 12 for mixed chorus and orchestra (1973–1974) to poems by Literature Nobel laureate Pablo Neruda with contemporary relevance and the cantata Vox Humana (1974) on texts by Latin American poets. During the prolific last decade of his life, he also wrote a concerto for violin and orchestra (1977–1978,  1980) written for the violinist Ida Haendel, a Symphony No. 16 (1979) which features a bravura solo part for alto saxophone commissioned by American saxophonist Frederick L. Hemke, and an incomplete, posthumously discovered concerto for viola and orchestra (1979–1980).

Legacy
In 1968–1969, conductor and composer Antal Doráti arranged eight of Pettersson's Barefoot Songs as full-scale orchestral songs.

Choreographer Birgit Cullberg produced three ballets based on Pettersson's music.  (1976, Symphony No. 7),  (1977, Concerto No. 1 for String Orchestra),  (War Dance) (1979, Symphony No. 9).

The four orchestral sketches "" (1991) by Peter Ruzicka are a tribute to Pettersson's life and work, quoting sketches of his unfinished Symphony No. 17.

Roy Andersson used the finale of Symphony No. 7 in his short film World of Glory.

After Pettersson died, the Allan Pettersson Gesellschaft (Society) issued six yearbooks, Classic Produktion Osnabrück CPO began recording his complete works, and a series of concerts (in 1994–1995) programmed almost all of them.

Awards
 1970 , No. 741
 1977 Litteris et Artibus
 1979  (Honorary Professorship Royal Swedish Academy of Music)

Discography
The selected discography includes the original format of the recording and releasing label. Some of the LP releases have been reissued on CD. A 12-CD pack of the Complete Symphonies of Allan Pettersson has been produced by CPO (Classic Produktion Osnabrück) based on recordings of 1984, 1988, 19911995, 2004. , a cycle of all Pettersson symphonies produced by BIS Records is ongoing.

Symphonies
 Symphony No. 1 (1951) (incomplete)
 Norrköping Symphony Orchestra, Christian Lindberg (performing version by Christian Lindberg) (BIS CD) 
 Symphony No. 2 (19521953)
 Swedish Radio Symphony Orchestra, Stig Westerberg (Swedish Society Discofil LP and CD) 
 BBC Scottish Symphony Orchestra, Alun Francis (CPO CD) 
 Norrköping Symphony Orchestra, Christian Lindberg (BIS CD) 
 Symphony No. 3 (19541955)
 Rundfunk-Sinfonieorchester Saarbrücken, Alun Francis (CPO CD) 
 Norrköping Symphony Orchestra, Leif Segerstam (BIS CD) 
 Symphony No. 4 (19581959)
 Göteborgs Symfoniker, Sergiu Comissiona (BIS LP)
 Rundfunk-Sinfonieorchester Saarbrücken, Alun Francis (CPO CD) 
 Norrköping Symphony Orchestra, Christian Lindberg (BIS CD) 
 Symphony No. 5 (19601962)
 Berliner Sibelius Orchester, Andreas Peer Kähler (Bluebell LP and CD) 
 Malmö Symphony Orchestra, Moshe Atzmon (BIS CD) 
 Rundfunk-Sinfonieorchester Saarbrücken, Alun Francis (CPO CD) 
 Norrköping Symphony Orchestra, Christian Lindberg (BIS CD) 
 Symphony No. 6 (19631966)
 Norrköping Symphony Orchestra, Okko Kamu (CBS LP) 
 Deutsches Symphonie-Orchester Berlin, Manfred Trojahn (CPO CD) 
 Norrköping Symphony Orchestra, Christian Lindberg (BIS CD) 
 Symphony No. 7 (19661967)
 Stockholm Philharmonic Orchestra, Antal Doráti (Swedish Society Discofil LP and CD/London LP) (Grammis 1970) 
 Swedish Radio Symphony Orchestra, Sergiu Comissiona (Caprice CD) 
 Philharmonisches Staatsorchester Hamburg, Gerd Albrecht (CPO CD) 
 Norrköping Symphony Orchestra, Leif Segerstam (BIS CD) 
 Norrköping Symphony Orchestra, Christian Lindberg (BIS CD) 
 Symphony No. 8 (19681969)
 Baltimore Symphony Orchestra, Sergiu Comissiona (Polar LP and Deutsche Grammophon LP) 
 Radio-Symphonie-Orchester Berlin, Thomas Sanderling (CPO CD) 
 Philharmonisches Staatsorchester Hamburg, Gerd Albrecht (Orfeo CD) 
 Norrköping Symphony Orchestra, Leif Segerstam (BIS CD) 
 Symphony No. 9 (1970)
 Göteborgs Symfoniker, Sergiu Comissiona (Philips LP)
 Deutsches Symphonie-Orchester Berlin, Alun Francis (CPO CD) 
 Norrköping Symphony Orchestra, Christian Lindberg (BIS CD) (Grammis 2015) 
 Symphony No. 10 (19711972)
 Swedish Radio Symphony Orchestra, Antal Doráti (EMI LP) 
 NDR Radiophilharmonie Hannover, Alun Francis (CPO CD) 
 Norrköping Symphony Orchestra, Leif Segerstam (BIS CD) 
 Symphony No. 11 (19711973)
 Norrköping Symphony Orchestra, Leif Segerstam (BIS CD) 
 NDR Radiophilharmonie Hannover, Alun Francis (CPO CD) 
 Symphony No. 12 "" ("The Dead of the Square") (19731974)
 Stockholm Philharmonic Orchestra, Stockholm Philharmonic Chorus, Uppsala University Chamber Choir, Carl Rune Larsson (Caprice LP and CD) 
 Swedish Radio Symphony Orchestra, Swedish Radio Choir, Eric Ericson Choir, Manfred Honeck (CPO CD) 
 Swedish Radio Choir, Eric Ericson Chamber Choir, Norrköping Symphony Orchestra, Christian Lindberg (BIS CD) 
 Symphony No. 13 (1976)
 BBC Scottish Symphony Orchestra, Alun Francis (CPO CD) 
 Norrköping Symphony Orchestra, Christian Lindberg (BIS CD) 
 Symphony No. 14 (1976)
 Stockholm Philharmonic Orchestra, Sergiu Comissiona (Phono Suecia CD) 
 Radio-Symphonie-Orchester Berlin, Johan M. Arnell (CPO CD) 
 Norrköping Symphony Orchestra, Christian Lindberg (BIS CD) 
 Symphony No. 15 (1978)
 Deutsches Symphonie-Orchester Berlin, Peter Ruzicka (CPO CD) 
 Norrköping Symphony Orchestra, Leif Segerstam (BIS CD) 
 Symphony No. 16 (1979)
 Frederick L. Hemke (Alto saxophone), Stockholm Philharmonic Orchestra, Yuri Ahronovitch (Swedish Society Discofil LP and CD) 
 John-Edward Kelly (Alto saxophone), Rundfunk-Sinfonieorchester Saarbrücken, Alun Francis (CPO CD) 
 Jörgen Pettersson (Alto saxophone), Norrköping Symphony Orchestra, Christian Lindberg (BIS CD) 
 Symphony No. 17 (1980) (fragment)
 Norrköping Symphony Orchestra, Christian Lindberg (BIS SACD-2290, 2019)

Other works
 Two Elegies (1934)
 Martin Gelland (Violin), Lennart Wallin (Piano) (BIS CD)  
 6 Songs (1935) (text by Gunnar Björling et al.).
 Margot Rödin (Mezzo-soprano), Arnold Östman (Piano) (Swedish Society Discofil LP and CD) 
 Andante espressivo (1938)
 Martin Gelland (Violin), Lennart Wallin (Piano) (BIS CD)  
 Romanza (1942)
 Martin Gelland (Violin), Lennart Wallin (Piano) (BIS CD)  
 24 Barefoot Songs (19431945)
 Erik Saedén (Baritone), Arnold Östman (Piano) (Swedish Society Discofil LP and CD) 
 Lamento for Piano (1945)
 Volker Banfield (CPO CD) 
 Lennart Wallin (BIS CD) 
 Concerto No. 1 for Violin and String Quartet (1949)
 Ulf Hoelscher (Violin), Mandelring-Quartett (CPO CD) 
 Concerto No. 1 for String Orchestra (19491950)
 Musica Vitae, Petter Sundkvist (Caprice CD) 
 Nordic Chamber Orchestra, Christian Lindberg (BIS CD)
 Deutsche Kammerakademie Neuss, Johannes Goritzki (CPO CD) 
 Seven Sonatas for two Violins (1951)
 Duo Gelland (BIS CD) 
 Concerto No. 2 for String Orchestra (1956)
 Musica Vitae, Petter Sundkvist (Caprice CD) 
 Nordic Chamber Orchestra, Christian Lindberg (BIS CD)
 Deutsche Kammerakademie Neuss, Johannes Goritzki (CPO CD) 
 Concerto No. 3 for String Orchestra (19561957)
 Nordic Chamber Orchestra, Christian Lindberg (BIS CD) 
 Deutsche Kammerakademie Neuss, Johannes Goritzki (CPO CD) 
 Symphonic Movement (1973) (commissioned by Swedish Radio TV channel TV1 for a film essay by Boris Engström)
 BBC Scottish Symphony Orchestra, Alun Francis (CPO CD) 
 Vox Humana (1974)
 Marianne Mellnas (Soprano), Margot Rodin (Alto), Sven-Erik Alexandersson (Tenor), Swedish Radio Symphony Orchestra, Swedish Radio Chorus, Stig Westerberg (BIS CD) 
 Concerto No. 2 for Violin and Orchestra (19771978)
 Ida Haendel (Violin), Swedish Radio Symphony Orchestra, Herbert Blomstedt (Caprice LP and CD) 
 Isabelle van Keulen (Violin), Swedish Radio Symphony Orchestra, Thomas Dausgaard (CPO CD) 
 Ulf Wallin (Violin), Norrköping Symphony Orchestra, Christian Lindberg (BIS SACD-2290, 2019) 
 Concerto for Viola and Orchestra (19791980)
 Nobuko Imai (Viola), Malmö Symphony Orchestra,  (BIS CD)

Writings

Notes

References

Citations

Documentary film

Bibliography

 
 
 
 
 
 
 
 
 
 
 
 
 
 
 
 
 
 
 
 
 
 
 
 
 
 
  (1985). (2nd ed.). New York: Taplinger. .

External links
 International Allan Pettersson Society – IAPG 
 Allan Pettersson Sällskapet / The Swedish Allan Pettersson Society 
 Paul Cauthen's Allan Pettersson Page
  Mark Shanks's Allan Pettersson Pages
 

1911 births
1980 deaths
20th-century classical composers
20th-century Swedish male musicians
Classical musicians with disabilities
Deaths from cancer in Sweden
Litteris et Artibus recipients
Members of the Royal Swedish Academy of Music
Musicians from Stockholm
People from Upplands-Bro Municipality
People of the Royal Stockholm Philharmonic Orchestra
Pupils of Arthur Honegger
Pupils of René Leibowitz
Pupils of Darius Milhaud
Royal College of Music, Stockholm alumni
Swedish classical composers
Swedish classical violists
Swedish male classical composers
Swedish people with disabilities